Maximilian Munski (born 10 January 1988) is a German former representative rower. He is an Olympian, an Olympic silver medallist and was selected in German senior crews at World Rowing Championships and Rowing World Cups between 2010 and 2016.

He was in the crew that won the gold medal in the men's eight competition at the 2015 European Rowing Championships.  At the 2016 Summer Olympics in Rio de Janeiro, he rowed in Germany's men's eight which won the silver medal. Those nine 2016 Olympic silver medal rowers were awarded the Silbernes Lorbeerblatt (Silver Laurel Leaf), Germany's highest sports award, for their achievements.

References

External links
 

1988 births
Living people
Sportspeople from Lübeck
German male rowers
World Rowing Championships medalists for Germany
Rowers at the 2016 Summer Olympics
Olympic rowers of Germany
Olympic silver medalists for Germany
Medalists at the 2016 Summer Olympics
Olympic medalists in rowing
European Rowing Championships medalists
Recipients of the Silver Laurel Leaf